Anders Peter Johnsson (born 1962) is a Swedish politician and former member of the Riksdag, the national legislature. A member of the Social Democratic Party, he represented Västra Götaland County North between September 2002 and September 2018.

Johnsson is the son of metal worker Sune Oskar Jonsson and bakery worker Britt Inga-Lill Jonsson. He was a grinder at Volvo Hydralic from 1979 to 1980, a sheet metal worker at Uddevallavarvet from 1980 to 1982 and a ventilation sheet metal worker from 1983 to 1987. He has been a sheet metal worker at the Volvo Aero Corporation in Trollhättan since 1987. He was a member of the municipal council in Trollhättan Municipality from 1998 to 2002.

References

1962 births
Living people
Members of the Riksdag 2002–2006
Members of the Riksdag 2006–2010
Members of the Riksdag 2010–2014
Members of the Riksdag 2014–2018
Members of the Riksdag from the Social Democrats
People from Trollhättan Municipality